Constantino Mollitsas (2 December 1899 – 24 September 1966) was a Brazilian footballer. He played in three matches for the Brazil national football team in 1920. He was also part of Brazil's squad for the 1920 South American Championship.

References

External links
 

1899 births
1966 deaths
Brazilian footballers
Brazil international footballers
Place of birth missing
Association football forwards
Grêmio Esportivo Brasil players
Santos FC players